The 1978 League of Ireland Cup Final was the final match of the 1977–78 League of Ireland Cup, a knock-out association football competition played annually by clubs affiliated with the League of Ireland. The competition was sponsored by Bass. The match was contested by Dundalk and Cork Alberts, and took place across two legs – with the first leg being played on 6 April 1978 at Oriel Park in Dundalk, and the second leg being played on 12 April 1978 at Flower Lodge in Cork. Both legs finished 2–2, and Dundalk subsequently won a penalty shoot-out to win the trophy for the first time.

Background
The League Cup was the first trophy of the 1977–78 League of Ireland season. The two sides had already met twice that season in the League, with the Cork side winning both matches. Dundalk were appearing in their first final in the competition, which had replaced the League of Ireland Shield in 1973. They reached the final by defeating Shelbourne (2–1), Shamrock Rovers (1–0), Home Farm (1–0), and Sligo Rovers (on penalties after a 3–3 aggregate draw across two legs).

Cork Alberts were appearing in their first domestic final, having entered the League of Ireland in 1976–77. They defeated Waterford (1–0), Thurles Town (4–2), Cork Celtic (1–0), and Bohemians (4–3 on aggregate) to reach the final.

Match

Summary
The first leg in Oriel Park saw Dundalk dominate the first half, yet approaching half-time they had failed to convert any of a number of chances. In the final seconds of the half, Jimmy Dainty sprung the Alberts' offside trap, and crossed for Terry Flanagan to score. The second half started in a similar vein, and Dundalk took a two goal lead in the 53rd minute – when Dainty headed a goal from a Mick Lawlor cross. Dundalk continued to push, but were caught out in the 61st minute when Alberts' Gerry Finnegan chipped a loose ball over the Dundalk goalkeeper, Richie Blackmore, and into the net from 25 metres. Dundalk then had a goal disallowed for offside and subsequently began to fade as Alberts dominated the closing stages. They got their equaliser in the 77th minute through Charlie McCarthy and the game ended 2–2.

The second leg repeated the pattern of the first, with Dundalk making the early running and taking a 7th minute lead through Mick Lawlor, who scored a volley from 25 metres. In the 21st minute Alberts equalised against the run of play, when Gerry Finnegan scored a free kick from the edge of the penalty area. Dundalk restored their lead a minute before half-time through Terry Flanagan, who finished off a well-worked team goal. Alberts forced Dundalk to defend deeply in the second half, and eventually scored a second equaliser in the 62nd minute, when James Nodwell met a headed clearance on the half-volley to fire to the net. With three minutes remaining Alberts were awarded a penalty, when Derek O'Brien was adjudged to have brought down Alberts winger Redmond Lane. Gerry Finnegan missed the resulting spot-kick, however, and the chance to win the final in normal time. The tie went straight to penalties, where both sides missed two kicks to send the shoot-out to sudden death. Alberts' player-manager Noel O'Mahony missed, and Dundalk's Tommy McConville scored, to send the cup to Oriel Park for the first time.

First leg details

Second leg details

References
Bibliography

Citations

League of Ireland Cup finals
League Of Ireland Cup Final 1978
League of Ireland Cup Final